Fifth (the title is Fifth while the front cover shows the number 5), is the fifth studio album by the jazz rock band Soft Machine, released in 1972. In the US the album was identified on cover and label by number (5).

Overview
Fifth was the first Soft Machine album recorded after the departure of founding member Robert Wyatt and continued the band's progression away from their original blend of psychedelic and progressive rock towards jazz fusion.  Wyatt's replacement was Phil Howard, who contributed to the 1971 sessions that comprise side one, after which he left and was replaced by John Marshall for the 1972 recordings that make up side two.  Future member Roy Babbington played double bass on side two, as a session musician.  Unlike the previous two albums, Elton Dean's saxophone is not augmented by a brass and reeds section composed of session musicians.

Track listing

Side one
"All White" (Mike Ratledge) – 6:06
"Drop" (Ratledge) – 7:42
"M C" (Hugh Hopper) – 4:57

Side two
"As If" (Ratledge) – 8:02
"L B O" (John Marshall) – 1:54
"Pigling Bland" (Ratledge) – 4:24
"Bone" (Elton Dean) – 3:29

2007 CD reissue bonus track
"All White" (take two) - 7:14

Personnel 
Soft Machine

Side one:
 Elton Dean – alto saxophone, saxello; Fender Rhodes electric piano (2)
 Mike Ratledge – Fender Rhodes electric piano, Lowrey organ 
 Hugh Hopper – bass guitar
 Phil Howard – drums 
Side two:
 Elton Dean – alto saxophone, saxello
 Mike Ratledge – Fender Rhodes electric piano, Lowrey organ 
 Hugh Hopper – bass guitar
 John Marshall – drums 
Additional musician
 Roy Babbington – double bass (Side two)

References

External links
 Soft Machine - Fifth (1972) album review by Wilson Neate, credits & releases at AllMusic
 Soft Machine - Fifth (1972) album releases & credits at Discogs
 Soft Machine - Fifth (1972) album credits & user reviews at ProgArchives.com
 Soft Machine - Fifth (1972) album to be listened on Spotify
 Soft Machine - Fifth (1972) album to be listened on YouTube

Soft Machine albums
1972 albums
CBS Records albums
Columbia Records albums